The second season of Enemigo íntimo is an American crime drama television series written by Lina Uribe and Darío Vanegas and deloveped by Telemundo Global Studios and Argos Comunicación.

The season was originally scheduled to premiere in April 2020, on the basic cable network Telemundo, but this was postponed indefinitely due to the COVID-19 pandemic. On 13 May 2020, it was confirmed that the series will premiere on 22 June 2020. The season concluded on 21 September 2020.

Cast and characters

Main 
 Raúl Méndez as Alejandro Ferrer
 Fernanda Castillo as Roxana Rodiles "El Profesor"
 Aitor Luna as Martín Ustariz
 Irán Castillo as Carmen Govea
 Manuel Ojeda as Don Jesús Padilla
 María del Carmen Félix as Ana Mercedes Calicio "La Puma"
 Elyfer Torres as Alicia García
 Luis Alberti as Javier Rivera
 Tiago Correa as Diego Lozano
 Germán Bracco as Manuel Salas
 Amaranta Ruiz as Gladys Bernal "La Mariscala"
 Erick Chapa as Arturo Morillo
 Yuvanna Montalvo as Karla Padilla
 Arturo García Tenorio as Díaz
 Claudette Maillé as Elisa Torres
 Héctor Kotsifakis as Héctor Moreno "El Sargento"
 Ruy Senderos as Ricardo Medina
 Julio Casado as Raúl Ortega "El Habanero"
 Jorge Gallegos as Alan Rodríguez
 Luis Zahera as El Gallego
 Tony Plana as Santilla

Guest stars 
 Matías Novoa as Daniel Laborde / Eduardo Tapia "El Tilapia"
 Alejandro Speitzer as Luis Rendón "El Berebere"
 Leonardo Daniel as Commander David Gómez

Production 
On 7 May 2018, Telemundo confirmed that the show has been renewed for a second season. The production of the second season began on 9 September 2019. On 13 December 2019, People en Español confirmed the season's cast, which features actors who appeared in the previous season and new inclusions. Unlike the first season, Matías Novoa will only have a special participation, due to his short time to record the season and El Señor de los Cielos.

Episodes

Notes

References 

2020 American television seasons
2020 Mexican television seasons